Balıkhisar is a neighborhood of the District of Akyurt, Ankara Province, Turkey.

In the 20th century, Balıkhisar was a fruit producing region, described by the British in 1920 as having the "finest fruit in Turkey."

References

Populated places in Ankara Province
Akyurt
Neighbourhoods of Akyurt